Hackett's Cove  is a rural community of the Halifax Regional Municipality in the Canadian province of Nova Scotia on the Chebucto Peninsula.

The community is home to radio transmitter maker Nautel Ltd.

References
Explore HRM
Nautel Ltd.

Communities in Halifax, Nova Scotia
General Service Areas in Nova Scotia